Samvel Danielyan (born 4 February 1971) is a retired Armenian-Russian Greco-Roman wrestler. He is a three-time Russian Champion, World Cup winner, European Champion, and World Champion.

Biography
Danielyan was born on 4 February 1971 in Baku. He started practicing Greco-Roman wrestling in 1978 under the teaching of Felix Avakov and the honored coach of the USSR Edward Kasparov. In 1987 he was made a member of the Soviet junior team. He became a Junior European Champion in 1987, Espoir European Champion, Junior World Champion, and Espoir World Cup winner in 1989, and Junior European Champion again in 1989. During the First Nagorno-Karabakh War, he moved to Krasnodar in 1989, and later to Rostov-on-Don where he continued wrestling under Pjotr Tchinibaljan. In 1991, he won the Espoir World Championship and the Wrestling World Cup as a senior.

Starting in 1992, Danielyan transitioned to the Russian national team, winning silver at the World Cup that year and winning bronze at the 1993 European Wrestling Championships. Danielyan won the 1995 World Wrestling Championships gold medal, defeating Armen Nazaryan in the final round. At the 1996 Summer Olympics, Danielyan was defeated by Nazaryan, who would go on to win the Olympic gold medal, in the semifinals. Danielyan lost to Andriy Kalashnykov in the bronze medal match. He won the European Wrestling Championships in 1999.

He completed his career in 2001. In March 2008, he moved to Moscow, and has been working in the Sports School No.64 at the Ivan Yarygin Sports Palace.

References

External links
 

1971 births
Living people
Sportspeople from Baku
Armenian wrestlers
Soviet male sport wrestlers
Russian male sport wrestlers
Wrestlers at the 1996 Summer Olympics
Olympic wrestlers of Russia
World Wrestling Championships medalists
Russian sportspeople of Armenian descent
European Wrestling Championships medalists